Jari Petteri Laukkanen (born 12 June 1965 in Kesälahti, North Karelia, Finland) is a Finnish male curler and curling coach.

He competed at the 2002 Winter Olympics where the Finnish men's curling team placed fifth.

He started curling in 1979 at the age of 14.

Teams

Record as a coach of national teams

References

External links

 Video: 

Living people
1965 births
People from Kesälahti

Finnish male curlers
Olympic curlers of Finland
Curlers at the 2002 Winter Olympics
European curling champions
Finnish curling champions
Finnish curling coaches
Sportspeople from North Karelia